Micropleurotoma spirotropoides is a species of sea snail, a marine gastropod mollusk in the family Horaiclavidae

Description
The length of the shell attains 5 mm.

Distribution
This marine species occurs in the Alborán Sea, Mediterranean and off Southeast Africa

References

  Thiele J., 1925. Gastropoden der Deutschen Tiefsee-Expedition. In:. Wissenschaftliche Ergebnisse der Deutschen Tiefsee-Expedition auf dem Dampfer “Valdivia” 1898–1899  II. Teil, vol. 17, No. 2, Gustav Fischer, Berlin
 Gofas, S.; Le Renard, J.; Bouchet, P. (2001). Mollusca. in: Costello, M.J. et al. (eds), European Register of Marine Species: a check-list of the marine species in Europe and a bibliography of guides to their identification. Patrimoines Naturels. 50: 180–213

External links
 
  Tucker, J.K. 2004 Catalog of recent and fossil turrids (Mollusca: Gastropoda). Zootaxa 682:1–1295.

spirotropoides
Gastropods described in 1925